Alzoniella hartwigschuetti is a species of spring snail, an aquatic gastropod in the family Hydrobiidae. This species is endemic to Austria.

References

Alzoniella
Hydrobiidae
Endemic fauna of Austria
Gastropods described in 1983
Taxonomy articles created by Polbot